Sheila Fox (January 1938 – disappeared 18 August 1944) was an English girl whose disappearance at the age of six from Farnworth, Lancashire, England has been called one of World War II England's most "baffling" mysteries. The press dubbed Fox "The Girl in the Green Mac".

Circumstances

Fox was last seen leaving her school at 4:00 pm in Farnworth on 18 August 1944, presumably on her way home, to which she never arrived. Companions of Fox claimed to have seen her with a man outside a bakery, where some accounts stated the pair were walking together and others stated she was sitting on the upturned crossbars of a black bicycle he was riding.

The subject seen with the unidentified man matched Fox's physical description and also wore the same clothes she had been last seen wearing. The man seen with Fox was described as a well-dressed, clean-shaven male of slim build between the ages of 25 and 30 years.

One of the witnesses claimed to have spoken with her and stated Fox said she was "going with this man" when asked where she was going. Due to the fact that Sheila Fox was described as very shy, it is believed she probably knew the man "very well" if she was to interact with him. Due to this, it is strongly believed that the individual responsible for the child's disappearance was someone that the victim was comfortable with. After this, no trace of Fox was ever reported again.

Fox's parents stated that Sheila may have been attempting to meet with friends in London. Family members, greatly affected by the event, long hoped that she was still alive, as police were unable to find her body. Neighbours of the Fox family stated that their hopes later changed to speculations that the girl had been murdered.

Investigation and aftermath
The case has always been treated as a missing person case, as no definitive evidence of murder, or even a body, has ever been found.

On the night of her disappearance and the following days, extensive searches for Fox were conducted in the area by both members of the police force and volunteers. Despite their efforts, police were unable to find any evidence, including the clothing she was wearing, of where she and the man had gone. Newspapers covered the story though it was soon overshadowed by the events of World War II.

An attempt was made in 1948 to link her disappearance with a "tall, thin man" wanted for stabbing two other children.

Searches for Fox were expanded in 2001, after police were notified by an individual claiming to have witnessed a twenty-year-old resident digging in the area around the time she had vanished, during the late hours of the night and had long suspected foul play was involved. This tip led to the case being reopened by investigators. The location was fairly close to where she lived. Residents expressed doubts that anything would be found, as earlier maintenance of the city sewers in the area had not unearthed any remains.

The property, at the time, was owned by the man seen digging, who is now deceased. The man was convicted of a rape six years after the disappearance and had later been convicted of a child's sexual assault in the 1960s. This site was later excavated manually by authorities in hopes of finding Fox's remains. The procedure, which began on 5 June 2001 and lasted a few days, was unsuccessful, as nothing of evidentiary value was discovered. The person of interest's son stated he had no knowledge of any circumstances requiring a police search.

See also
List of people who disappeared

References

External links
 Disappearance of Sheila Fox at historicbolton.com
 Contemporary BBC news article pertaining to the 2001 search of a Farnworth property for the body of Sheila Fox
 

1930s births
1940s missing person cases
August 1944 events
Kidnapped English children
Missing English children
Missing person cases in England
People from Farnworth
Incidents of violence against girls
Living people